Monaghan railway station was on the Ulster Railway designed by Sir John Macneil located in the Republic of Ireland.

History
The Ulster Railway opened the station on 2 March 1863.

It closed to regular passenger traffic on 14 October 1957 but goods, mails and occasional passenger traffic continued until the end of 1959 .  It was part of the Great Northern Railway of Ireland railway system.

Routes

References

Disused railway stations in County Monaghan
Railway stations opened in 1863
Railway stations closed in 1957